This is a list of rugby league footballers who have played first grade for the Illawarra Steelers. Players are listed in the order they made their debut.

Players

External links
Rugby League Tables / Illawarra Steelers Point Scorers
RLP List of Players
RLP Illawarra Steelers Transfers & Debuts

 
Lists of Australian rugby league players
National Rugby League lists
Wollongong-related lists